Kevin Ward may refer to:

 Kevin Ward (audio engineer) (born 1968), American engineer, record producer, and songwriter
 Kevin Ward (baseball) (1961–2019), American baseball player
 Kevin Ward (geographer), British geographer and academic
 Kevin Ward (rugby league) (born 1957), English rugby league footballer
 Kevin Ward, Jr. (1994–2014), American sprint car racing driver
 Kevin L. Ward (born 1963), American police officer and Oklahoma Secretary of Safety and Security